Francis Howell North High School is a secondary school located in St. Charles, Missouri. The school's mascot is Norm the Knight.

History
After Francis Howell High School alone could no longer support the burgeoning population of its part of St. Charles County in 1983, Henderson Junior High School was built on Hackmann Road on the border of the cities of St. Charles and St. Peters. Henderson was eventually expanded and the name was changed to Francis Howell North High School and began taking high school students in 1986. A third high school (Francis Howell Central) was built in 1997.

The school is named after the early settler and militia leader Col. Francis Howell, who moved to St. Charles in 1797.  His brother, Lewis Howell, was an advocate for education in the area.

Athletics and activities
The Francis Howell North Knights are home to a few official athletic team State Championships, including: the 1991 wrestling team, 1995 Varsity girls soccer team, and 3 State titles in  hockey. The high school's newspaper, The North Star, has also earned many national awards. The Knightpride Marching Band, Concert Band, and Jazz Band have also competed on a national level, as has the Francis Howell North Speech/Debate team.

Notable alumni
 Brandon Bollig – professional ice hockey player for the San Jose Sharks, Calgary Flames and the Chicago Blackhawks
 Mark Buehrle – professional baseball player for the Chicago White Sox, Miami Marlins, and the Toronto Blue Jays

References

External links
 Official website

Educational institutions established in 1983
High schools in St. Charles County, Missouri
Public high schools in Missouri
1983 establishments in Missouri